In mathematics, a canonical map, also called a natural map, is a map or morphism between objects that arises naturally from the definition or the construction of the objects. Often, it is a map which preserves the widest amount of structure. A choice of a canonical map sometimes depends on a convention (e.g., a sign convention).

A closely related notion is a structure map or structure morphism; the map or morphism that comes with the given structure on the object. These are also sometimes called canonical maps.

A canonical isomorphism is a canonical map that is also an isomorphism (i.e., invertible). In some contexts, it might be necessary to address an issue of choices of canonical maps or canonical isomorphisms; for a typical example, see prestack.

For a discussion of the problem of defining a canonical map see Kevin Buzzard's talk at the 2022 Grothendieck conference.

Examples
If N is a normal subgroup of a group G, then there is a canonical surjective group homomorphism from G to the quotient group G/N, that sends an element g to the coset determined by g.
If I is an ideal of a ring R, then there is a canonical surjective ring homomorphism from R onto the quotient ring R/I, that sends an element r to its coset I+r.
If V is a vector space, then there is a canonical map from V to the second dual space of V, that sends a vector v to the linear functional fv defined by fv(λ) = λ(v).
If  is a homomorphism between commutative rings, then S can be viewed as an algebra over R. The ring homomorphism f is then called the structure map (for the algebra structure). The corresponding map on the prime spectra  is also called the structure map.
If E is a vector bundle over a topological space X, then the projection map from E to X is the structure map.
In topology, a canonical map is a function f mapping a set X → X/R (X modulo R), where R is an equivalence relation on X, that takes each x in X to the equivalence class [x] modulo R.

References

Mathematical terminology